Bartalini is an Italian surname. Notable people with the surname include:

Biagio Bartalini (1750–1822), Italian physician and botanist
Ezio Bartalini (1884–1962), Italian politician
Marcello Bartalini (born 1962), Italian cyclist

See also
Bartolini

Italian-language surnames